Teinoptera oliva is a moth of the family Noctuidae. It is found in Greece, Turkey, Syria, Armenia and Transcaucasia.

Adults are on wing from May to July.

External links
Lepiforum.de
species info

Cuculliinae
Moths of Europe
Moths of Asia
Taxa named by Otto Staudinger